Air Marshal Venkataraman Ramamurthy Iyer, PVSM, AVSM,  is a retired Three-Star Air Marshal of the Indian Air Force. His final assignment with the Air Force was as Air Officer Commanding in Chief of the Indian Air Force Training Command.

Awards and decorations

References

Indian Air Force air marshals